Arkhangelskaya Melnitsa is a rural locality (a village) in Ust-Alexeyevskoye Rural Settlement, Velikoustyugsky District, Vologda Oblast, Russia. The population was 29 as of 2002.

Geography 
Arkhangelskaya Melnitsa is located 56 km southeast of Veliky Ustyug (the district's administrative centre) by road. Gorbishchevo is the nearest rural locality.

References 

Rural localities in Velikoustyugsky District